Schwarzsauer is a North German blood soup with various spices cooked in vinegar-water and a sort of black pudding made with vinegar. It is a traditional dish in parts of northern Germany and formerly also in East Prussia. It is similar to the Spartan black soup.

References 

German cuisine
Blood soups